Granton is a community in the Canadian province of Nova Scotia, located in  Pictou County. It is the birthplace of Leonard W. Murray. The community was named for Granton, Edinburgh.

References

External links
Granton on Destination Nova Scotia

Communities in Pictou County
General Service Areas in Nova Scotia